Banana bract mosaic virus (BBrMV) is a plant pathogenic virus of the family Potyviridae.

Transmission
BBrMV is transmitted by aphid.

External links
ICTVdB - The Universal Virus Database: Banana bract mosaic virus
Family Groups - The Baltimore Method

Viral plant pathogens and diseases
Potyviruses